Esperanza Guadalupe Llori Abarca (born 1962) is an Ecuadorian politician who was prefect of Orellana Province. She is a member of the Pachakutik Plurinational Unity Movement. She served as President of the National Assembly of Ecuador from May 2021 to May 2022.

Career
Her term was primarily focused on improving healthcare.

On 8 December 2007, she was arrested on charges of sabotage and terrorism for allegedly organizing a strike in Dayuma, Ecuador. During her detention, she reported experiencing humiliation and mistreatment, compelling the Human Rights Foundation to send a complaint to the Ecuadorian government. On 25 January 2008, a judge of the Superior Court of Nueva Loja ordered her release, but the order was annulled just days later after the judge was accused of perverting the course of justice after stating his opinion on the matter to a local TV station.

In early March 2008, the Ecuadorian Constituent Assembly granted amnesty to everyone involved in the Dayuma strike, but Llori remained incarcerated. There were allegations against her of embezzlement of public funds intended for the construction of roads in Orellana Province. On 7 March, she was dismissed from her position by the provincial council in a 3–2 vote, and she was succeeded by Alberto Zambrano. In September of that year, she was cleared of the charge of embezzlement, finally leaving prison after nine months in prison. In January 2009, a judge ordered that Llori be restored to her office, but this was successfully appealed by Zambrano.

On 15 May 2021, she was elected the new president of parliament in Ecuador. On 31 May 2022, she was removed as president of parliament in Ecuador and replaced by Virgilio Saquicela.

References

Living people
Pachakutik Plurinational Unity Movement – New Country politicians
21st-century Ecuadorian women politicians
Women mayors of places in Ecuador
People from Orellana Province
Presidents of the National Assembly (Ecuador)
21st-century Ecuadorian politicians
Women legislative speakers
1962 births